Catherine Clarke may refer to:

 Catherine Clarke (academic), British historian, professor at the Institute of Historical Research
 Catherine Clarke Fenselau (born 1939), American scientist working in mass spectrometry
 Catherine Freitag Clarke, American biochemist
 Catherine Goddard Clarke, American writer, educator and religious leader

See also
 Catherine Clark (disambiguation)
 Katherine Clarke (disambiguation)